USS LST-479 was a United States Navy  used in the Asiatic-Pacific Theater during World War II.

Construction
LST-479 was laid down on 25 August 1942, under Maritime Commission (MARCOM) contract, MC hull 999, by  Kaiser Shipyards, Yard No. 4, Richmond, California; launched on 4 October 1942;  and commissioned on 19 April 1943.

Service history
During the war, LST-479 was assigned to the Pacific Theater of Operations. She took part in the Gilbert Islands operation, November and December 1943; the Occupation of Kwajalein and Majuro Atolls in February 1944; the Battle of Hollandia in April 1944; the Battle of Guam in July 1944; and the Battle of Okinawa in April 1945.

Post-war service
Following the war, LST-479 returned to the United States and was decommissioned on 28 February 1946, and struck from the Navy list on 28 March 1946. On 16 April 1948, the ship was sold to the Bethlehem Steel Co., Bethlehem, Pennsylvania, and subsequently scrapped.

Honors and awards
LST-479 earned five battle stars for her World War II service.

Notes 

Citations

Bibliography 

Online resources

External links

 

LST-1-class tank landing ships
World War II amphibious warfare vessels of the United States
Ships built in Richmond, California
1942 ships
S3-M2-K2 ships